Malayikkuthu (Malayikuthu, Malayikkuth) is a dance ritual performed by the people of Malayi sect in Kerala, South India. Devakanni and Narada are two characters that comprise Malayikkuthu. Davakanni's costume consists of gold and silver ornaments, pleated cloths and dotted dresses. Narada wears silver ornaments and other colorful clothes. The face is decorated with turmeric and body paint. It is performed in front of a lighted lamp. (see: Nilavilakku) Devakanni enters first. Other designates too accompany. Narada enters later and they dance together.

The theme of Malayikkuthhu is as follows: Seven virgins descended on earth to collect flowers. One lost her way and could not join others. Others headed back to heaven. A wandering Narada happened to see her and he wanted her to continue in this world itself.

Malayikkuth is performed in the district of Kannur at Cherukunnu Thekkumpadath. This is also known as Devakkuth.

See also
 Arts of Kerala
 Kerala Folklore Akademi

Dances of Kerala